John Ap-Adam III, 1st Baron Ap-Adam (died May 1311) was created baron by writ in 1299.

The first baron served in the Scottish wars.  On 22 July 1298, he served in the battle of Falkirk and was knighted and borne his coat of arms afterwards.

Ap-Adam married Elizabeth de Gurnay, the daughter of John de Gurnay Baron of Beverstone, and Olivia Lovel. They had at least one son, Sir Thomas Ap-Adam, who left children.

This Thomas was never summoned to parliament; thus the barony became dormant.

References
 Burke, Sir Bernard. "Ap-Adam, Barons de Ap-Adam." A Genealogical History of the Dormant, Abeyant, Forfeited, and Extinct Peerages, of the British Empire. London: William Clowes and Sons, Ltd., 1962. p. 8.

Barons in the Peerage of England
1311 deaths
Year of birth unknown